Dira may refer to:

People
 Bernadett Dira (born 1980), Hungarian biathlete
 Dira Paes (born 1969), Brazilian actress
 Dira Sugandi, Indonesian singer and actress
Dira Abu Zahar, Malaysian politician and former actress

Places
 Dira, Burkina Faso
Dira, a village in Borno State, Nigeria

Other
 Dira (butterfly), genus of butterflies from the subfamily Satyrinae in the family Nymphalidae
 Dira, a minor character in the TV series Rimba Racer
Deficiency of the interleukin-1–receptor antagonist (DIRA), autoinflammatory syndrome
Dirac (dress) or dirá, Somali garment
 dira, also transliterated dhira, one of the ancient Arabic units of measurement

See also
 Dhira, Punjab, India